Hyung Min-woo (born 14 April 1974) is a South Korean manhwa artist best known for Priest.

References

External links 
 
 Getting to Know “Priest:” Manhwa Artist Min-Woo Hyung
 Manhwa: A Boundless Treasure Trove of Cultural Content by Kim Se-joon (interviews Hyung and Ji Gang-min)

1974 births
South Korean manhwa artists
Living people
Jinju Hyeong clan